"Harmony" is a 1979 song by Suzi Lane from the album Ooh, La, La. The song was written by Giorgio Moroder, Pete Bellotte, and Geoff Bastow and produced by Moroder.

Chart performance
Along with the track "Ooh, La, La", the song went to number one for one week on the Billboard disco/dance chart. "Harmony" failed to chart on either the Billboard Hot 100 or the R&B chart.

References

1979 singles
1979 songs
Disco songs
Elektra Records singles
Song recordings produced by Giorgio Moroder
Songs written by Giorgio Moroder
Songs written by Pete Bellotte